East Saline Township is a township in Sheridan County, Kansas, United States. As of the 2010 Census, it had a population of 45.

History
East Saline Township and West Saline Township were originally part of Saline Township, which was divided in two in 1917.  Saline Township had a population of 849 in the 1910 census.

References

Townships in Sheridan County, Kansas
Townships in Kansas